The Nowhere Man is a 2017 thriller novel written by Gregg Hurwitz. It is the second of the 6-part series named "Orphan X Thrillers" from the author.

The follow-up book Hellbent was released in February 2018.

Plot
The novel begins with a case of cyberbullying a humble family girl who ends up being a victim of a network of human traffic. Evan Smoak saves the girl but realizes that another young woman has been embarked on a freighter to be sold. When he prepares to save her, he himself is kidnapped by a group of professionals, drugged and transferred to a mansion in the middle of the mountains.

At first Evan believes that his mortal enemy, Van Sciver, is behind everything, but the owner of the mansion introduces himself as René, a cynical criminal addicted to luxury that all he wants is access to the bulky secret account of Evan.

Despite being a man with many resources, Smoak soon realizes that it will not be easy for him to escape from his cage: the mansion is guarded by mercenaries, dobermans, two snipers and René's personal behemoth of a man, Dex.

Meanwhile, in Ukraine, the lethal Candy McClure, whose code name Orphan V, remains obsessed with getting revenge on Smoak, but begins to question the methods of her organization when an innocent girl is killed by her new partner, a psychopath eunuch nicknamed Orphan M.

References

External links
 

American thriller novels
2017 American novels
Books by Gregg Hurwitz
Minotaur Books books
Works set in country houses